The defending champion was Steffi Graf, but chose not to participate. Martina Navratilova won the title, defeating Jennifer Capriati in the final, 6–2, 6–4.

Seeds 
All seeds received a bye to the second round.

Draw

Finals

Top half

Section 1

Section 2

Bottom half

Section 1

Section 2

References

External links 
 ITF tournament edition details

1990 WTA Tour
Charleston Open
Family Circle Cup
Family Circle Cup
Family Circle Cup